"Beijing Beijing, I Love Beijing" is a Chinese song written by Kwan Ju and performed by Guan Zhe on the official Beijing 2008 album.

At the 2008 Summer Olympics closing ceremony in Beijing, the song was performed by Hong Kong singer Kelly Chen, Chinese singer Han Xue, Taiwanese-American singer Leehom Wang, and Korean artist Rain.

External links
 Lyrics (Chinese) (translation)
 Streaming Audio page (different singer from the closing ceremony)

2008 Summer Olympics
Olympic theme songs
2008 songs